Lehigh is a city in Webster County, Iowa, United States. The population was 395 at the time of the 2020 census.

Located in a valley, Lehigh is divided in two by the Des Moines River, unusual for such a small town. Originally the two halves of Lehigh were two separate towns. While the town on the west side of the River was always called Lehigh, the east town was called Slabtown, and a piece of history marks the east side's roots––a sign that hangs over the playground with the words "Slabtown Traders," perhaps alluding to the flea market which is held there every summer during Lehigh River Days. The "Slabtown Traders" sign was blown over by a gust of wind in the summer of 2010. It survived several floods while being located on River Street. Lehigh was surrounded by coal mines until the early 20th century and home to a large clay sewer pipe factory until the 1980s. Dolliver State Park, Brushy Creek State Recreation Area and Woodman Hollow State Preserve are located within a few miles of the town.

History
Lehigh's first settlers, a Mr. Reed and Mr. Wright, set up a steam sawmill on the site in 1855.  Originally, the town was named Slabtown because slabs, scrap from the mill, were used in construction.  By 1870, there was a Methodist church and a school, and Oliver Tyson had purchased the mill and expanded it, adding a flour mill.  Soon after this, Tyson opened a store.  The town was later renamed Lehigh, comparing the local coal veins to those of Pennsylvania's Lehigh Valley.

In 1871, W. C. Wilson of Webster City opened a coal mine in Lehigh and formed the Crooked Creek Railroad and Coal Company.  The company built a 3-foot gauge rail line from Judd, on the Illinois Central Railroad 8.5 miles south to the mines, including a 370-foot wooden truss bridge across the Des Moines River.  The line was later extended to Webster City.  By 1894, the company had opened 5 mines, all using longwall mining.  The Webster Coal and Land Company operated a mine near Lehigh from 1899 to 1902.

In 1878, Lehigh shipped 5,640 tons of coal.  In 1883, 6,887 tons were shipped, in 1884, 9,000 tons.  Membership in the United Mine Workers union is a useful measure of the importance of mining.  In 1912, Lehigh was home to UMW Local 855 with 64 members (about 6.9% of the 1910 population).

The Crooked Creek railroad was widened to standard gauge in 1880 and a line to Webster City was built in 1886.  In 1916, the line was incorporated into the Fort Dodge, Des Moines and Southern Railroad, Iowa's longest Interurban line.  Diesel traction replaced overhead electric lines in the 1950s and the track was abandoned in 1962.

By 1901, Lehigh was large enough to support a new First National Bank, with an initial capitalization of $25,000.  The bank must have been small; in 1910, O. J. Woodward arrived in town to become the cashier, manager and director of the bank.

In addition to coal mines, Lehigh was home to several other industries.  The most prominent were brickyards that used the shale of the coal measures as a source of clay to make both brick and drain tile, firing their kilns with local coal.  One of these, the Lehigh Brick and Tile company, won the contract to provide paving brick for Dubuque, Iowa in 1896, but suffered a serious fire in late 1897.

In 1901, there were 2 large brickworks in Lehigh, the Corey Pressed Brick Company and the Lehigh Clay Works, which began operation in 1900.  In addition, the old Lehigh Brick and Tile works was being rebuilt after the fire.  Corey was mining clay from both above and below the coal seam.  By 1903, Lehigh Brick and Tile was back in production, the Lehigh and the Campbell brickyard of the Webster city Brick and Tile Company.  The Cory plant was primarily a brickworks, while the others primarily produced drainage tile.

Geography
Lehigh is located at  (42.357332, −94.051283) on the west bank of the Des Moines River.

Demographics

2010 census
As of the census of 2010, there were 416 people, 205 households, and 118 families residing in the city. The racial makeup of the city was 98.6% White, 0.2% African American, and 1.2% from two or more races. Hispanic or Latino of any race were 0.2% of the population.

There were 205 households, of which 18.0% had children under the age of 18 living with them, 43.4% were married couples living together, 7.3% had a female householder with no husband present, 6.8% had a male householder with no wife present, and 42.4% were non-families. 36.6% of all households were made up of individuals, and 19.1% had someone living alone who was 65 years of age or older. The average household size was 2.03 and the average family size was 2.61.

The median age in the city was 49.8 years. 16.8% of residents were under the age of 18; 8.7% were between the ages of 18 and 24; 16.6% were from 25 to 44; 36% were from 45 to 64; and 21.9% were 65 years of age or older. The gender makeup of the city was 51.7% male and 48.3% female.

2000 census
As of the census of 2000, there were 497 people, 223 households, and 130 families residing in the city. The racial makeup of the city was 98.19% White, 0.40% African American, 0.20% from other races, and 1.21% from two or more races. Hispanic or Latino of any race were 0.20% of the population.

There were 223 households, out of which 23.3% had children under the age of 18 living with them, 45.3% were married couples living together, 4.9% had a female householder with no husband present, and 41.7% were non-families. 35.0% of all households were made up of individuals, and 15.7% had someone living alone who was 65 years of age or older. The average household size was 2.23 and the average family size was 2.86.

In the city, the population was spread out, with 24.5% under the age of 18, 6.0% from 18 to 24, 24.1% from 25 to 44, 25.2% from 45 to 64, and 20.1% who were 65 years of age or older. The median age was 42 years. For every 100 females, there were 110.6 males. For every 100 females age 18 and over, there were 110.7 males.

The median income for a household in the city was $25,227, and the median income for a family was $31,458. Males had a median income of $26,484 versus $24,250 for females. The per capita income for the city was $13,816. About 10.5% of families and 14.9% of the population were below the poverty line, including 27.4% of those under age 18 and 3.9% of those age 65 or over.

Education
Lehigh is a part of the Southeast Webster-Grand Community School District, established on July 1, 2005 by the merger of the Grand Community School District and the Southeast Webster Community School District. It was previously served by the Southeast Webster Community School District, which was formed on July 1, 1991 with the merger of the Central Webster Community School District and the Dayton Community School District.

Notable persons

Hugh Lester, professional soccer player for Liverpool F.C.
John Donaldson (pitcher) ended his 30+-year professional baseball career in Lehigh (1949).

References

Cities in Iowa
Cities in Webster County, Iowa
Populated places established in 1855
1855 establishments in Iowa